Robert Wallon (16 January 1886 – 3 April 1973) was a French equestrian. He competed at the 1924 Summer Olympics and the 1928 Summer Olympics.

References

External links
 

1886 births
1973 deaths
French male equestrians
Olympic equestrians of France
Equestrians at the 1924 Summer Olympics
Equestrians at the 1928 Summer Olympics
Sportspeople from Aisne